The 47th FIS Alpine World Ski Championships took place from 6 to 19 February 2023 in two neighboring locations in the French Alps, Courchevel and Méribel.

The location was decided in May 2018 during the 51st FIS Congress in Costa Navarino (Greece), where Courchevel-Méribel won against Austrian Saalbach-Hinterglemm with 9 to 6 votes.

The same two towns already hosted parts of the 1992 Winter Olympic Games. In Courchevel, ski jumping and the Nordic combination took place, and Méribel was the location for the women's alpine skiing.

Bidding
In 2015, upon a request by the Fédération Française de Ski (FFS), Courchevel, Méribel and Val d'Isère drew up proposals to organize a ski world championship in France. In January 2016, the FFS then chose the joint bid of Courchevel and Méribel. On 24 January 2017, the bid of the two alpine resorts was submitted to the FIS. Finally, in May 2018, the FIS selected the French bid, after competing against the Austrian bid. The then-time president of the Austrian Ski Association, Peter Schröcksnadel, commented that the decision was understandable, as the French had been waiting for a World Championships in their own country for four years longer than the Austrians, and that Austria had already hosted several large sport events during the last few years.

In March 2022, Courchevel and Méribel hosted the finals of the 2021–22 FIS Alpine Ski World Cup.

Qualification
Per discipline and gender, each national ski federation could nominate four skiers. The current world champion in the respective discipline was allowed as a fifth competitor. In addition, every participant must had less than 80 FIS points. Skiers who perform better in recent official competitions have less points; the top 30 skiers on the current World Cup starting list have, by definition, between 0 and 5.99 FIS Points. In some events, competitors passed a further qualification at the Championships themselves (see below).

Schedule
The competitive program was as follows (all times CET):

Qualifying races

Medal summary

Medal table

Events

Men's events

Women's events

Mixed

References

External links

 
2023
2023 in alpine skiing
2023 in French sport
Alpine skiing competitions in France
February 2023 sports events in France
International sports competitions hosted by France